Cherepanova Hora is a historical neighbourhood of Kyiv and an elevation.

History
The name appeared after 1815 when a civil governor of Kyiv was Pavel Cherepanov and on the hill was located his manor. On the hill are located basic structures of the New Pechersk Fortress (Hospital fortifications), a complex which today is part of museum-sanctuary "Kyiv Fortress" and a military hospital. Nearby also is located the Kosyi (Oblique) Caponier also known as Kyiv Schlisselburg as it served as a political prison in 1863-1918. 

At the foot of the hill stretches an esplanade, empty and open space between the citadel and the city, about which reminds the name of street Esplanadna.

In 1897 slopes of the hill were decorated with pavilions of the All-Russian Industrial Exposition, and designed by such architects as Gorodetsky, Kobelev, and Zhuravsky.

Sometimes in the beginning of 20th century, on the hill was created the Alekseevskiy Garden. 

In 1913 there took place the All-Russian Industrial and Agrarian Exposition.

In 1920 there was built the Red Stadium, today better known as the Olimpiyskiy National Sports Complex.

References

External links
 A city on 20 mountains (Город на двадцати горах). Interesniy Kiev. 11 July 2008
 Developers have great views on Cherepanova Hora (У застройщиков большие виды на Черепанову гору). Interesniy Kiev. 18 March 2008

Neighborhoods in Kyiv
Hills of Kyiv
Pecherskyi District